Blind Alley is a 1926 play by the British author Dorothy Brandon. It is a drama about an unhappily married woman who begins to develop feelings for an actor.

It premiered at the Pleasure Gardens Theatre in Folkestone, as had her previous hit play The Outsider, before transferring to the Playhouse Theatre in London's West End. However, it was considerably less successful than her earlier works and ran for only thirteen performances. The cast included Elissa Landi, Sam Livesey and Annie Esmond.

References

1926 plays
Plays by Dorothy Brandon
British plays
West End plays